John Clements Gregory (May 17, 1879, London, England – 1958) was an American sculptor.

Life

When he was about 12 years old his family immigrated to the United States where he began his sculptural studies at the Art Students League in New York City.  He continued these at both the École des Beaux-Arts in Paris and at the American Academy in Rome.  At various times he studied with J. Massey Rhind, George Grey Barnard, Hermon MacNeil, Gutzon Borglum, Herbert Adams, and Antonin Mercié.  He became a United States citizen in 1912 and during the First World War served in the camouflage section of the U.S. Navy.

He was one of a dozen sculptors invited to compete in the Pioneer Woman statue competition in 1927, which he failed to win. In 1927 he was elected into the National Academy of Design as an Associate member and became a full Academician in 1934.

In 1932 Gregory produced 9 marble bas reliefs for Paul Cret's Folger Shakespeare Library in Washington, D.C.  Each panel depicted a scene from a different play by Shakespeare.

In 1937, he completed a gilded bronze equestrian statue of Anthony Wayne for the Philadelphia Museum of Art.

Gregory is well known for his architectural sculpture.  Examples include bas relief panels on the structure and sarcophagus of the Huntington Mausoleum by architect John Russell Pope at The Huntington Library in San Marino, California; and the larger-than-life panels, Columbia and Urban Life, on either side of the steps in John Marshall Park, Judiciary Square, Washington, D.C.

Gregory was a member of the National Sculpture Society, the American Federation of Arts, and the Beaux-Arts Institute of Design.

Sources

External links
"Gregory, John, 1879-1958, sculptor". SIRIS

American architectural sculptors
American male sculptors
Art Students League of New York alumni
American alumni of the École des Beaux-Arts
1879 births
1958 deaths
20th-century American sculptors
20th-century American male artists
Sculptors from New York (state)
Members of the American Academy of Arts and Letters
British emigrants to the United States